Lake Nona Golf & Country Club is a private residential golf club community in southeast Orlando, Florida. The community is planned and developed by the Tavistock Group, an international private investment company founded by British businessman Joe Lewis. 

The  community features an 18-hole championship golf course designed by Tom Fazio.

Golf course 
Designed by premier golf architect Tom Fazio, the championship course is favored by countless professional golfers and world-class athletes who call Lake Nona home.

Designed in 1986, Lake Nona is continually ranked as one of the top 100 golf courses in the world. It meanders through natural pine forests and oak groves as it stretches along three lakes. The course yardage sets a challenge to all levels of players, from 4,221 yards off the forward tees to 7,200 yards off the championship tees.

Tournaments hosted 
Lake Nona has hosted a variety of professional and amateur golf tournaments including:

Professional

Solheim Cup: 1990 (Inaugural)
World Cup of Golf: 1993
U.S. Open Qualifier (Men): 1993, 2003, 2009
U.S. Open Qualifier (Ladies): 1993
Tavistock Cup: 2004, 2007, 2009, 2012
Gainbridge LPGA: 2021
Hilton Grand Vacations Tournament of Champions (LPGA): 2022, 2023

Amateur

 Florida State Amateur: 1989, 1999
 U.S. Southern Amateur (Men): 1994, 2008
 U.S. Southern Amateur (Ladies): 1995
 USGA Centennial Men’s State Team Tournament: 1995
 Florida Women’s State Amateur Championship: 1996
 USGA Senior Amateur Championship: 2010

Residential 
Set amidst freshwater lakes and oak, pine and cypress trees, Lake Nona Golf & Country Club offers a range of residences from luxury condominiums to expansive estates.

Notable residents 
Residents, past and present, include Annika Sörenstam, Graeme McDowell, Víctor Martínez, Nick Faldo, David Leadbetter, Ernie Els, Lou Holtz, Ian Poulter, Justin Rose, Henrik Stenson, Charles Woodson, Gary Woodland, Ben An, Tyrrell Hatton and Lydia Ko.

References 

Buildings and structures in Orlando, Florida
Golf clubs and courses in Greater Orlando
Sports venues in Orlando, Florida
Tavistock Group
Solheim Cup venues
Planned communities in Florida
1986 establishments in Florida
Sports venues completed in 1986